Arizona is an unincorporated community in Burt County, Nebraska, United States.

History
A post office was established at Arizona in 1867, and remained in operation until it was discontinued in 1888. The community was named after the Arizona Territory.

References

Unincorporated communities in Burt County, Nebraska
Unincorporated communities in Nebraska